Cowlesite is a mineral named after American mineralogist John Cowles. It was first described by W.S. Wise and Rudy W. Tschernich in material from roadcuts along Neer Road, Goble, Oregon, United States. The description also incorporated data from Superior, Arizona. It most often occurs as small colorless to white spheres in basalt, and is often associated with other zeolites.

References

- Cowlesite
- Cowlesite
- Cowlesite

Zeolites